The Fiat Moretti Sportiva is a small coupé produced by the Moretti Motor Company based on the Fiat 850 from 1967 to 1971. It was based on the engine and chassis of a Fiat 850 Coupe

History 
Introduced in 1965 at the Turin Motor Show, the Sport was Moretti’s last car that could be customised beyond the usual of choice of seat colours. There was the possibility to obtain trim and equipment levels of great prestige for the age according to the buyer’s taste. The Sport was initially proposed as a two-seater coupé although it became available as a convertible. The original sport had dual headlights, although a dealer from Switzerland fitted two sports with quad headlights to resemble the not yet available Fiat Dino.

Specifications 

The standard engine was later enlarged to 982 cc. Due to the aerodynamic profile, it was necessary to mount the spare wheel horizontally in the front luggage area, occupying it entirely. Therefore, the designers had to create a luggage compartment, made from a stiff cloth, between the seats and the engine space. The lack of rear seats was unappreciated by purchasers and in the successive year, Moretti introduced the S4 four seater.

Production 
Approximately 300 examples of the Sport were produced in various forms (around 52 examples of the Moretti Sportiva S2). The base price for the Moretti Sport in 1967 was 1.095.000 Liras which could increase with personalisation to nearly two million Lira. In comparison, the more luxurious and modern Fiat 124 in the same year had a list price of 1.035.000 Liras.

References 

Cars introduced in 1965
Rear-engined vehicles